Open Door Christian Academy is a private, co-educational Christian school in Troutdale, Oregon, United States.  It was founded in 1978 as a ministry of Open Door Baptist Church and serves students in grades K-12.

References

High schools in Multnomah County, Oregon
Private middle schools in Oregon
Christian schools in Oregon
Private elementary schools in Oregon
Private high schools in Oregon
Troutdale, Oregon
1978 establishments in Oregon